Coalaque District is one of eleven districts of the General Sánchez Cerro Province in Peru.

Geography 
Other mountains are listed below:

References